The following is a list of notable people diagnosed with Crohn's disease. Crohn's disease is a type of inflammatory bowel disease that may affect any part of the gastrointestinal tract from mouth to anus, causing a wide variety of symptoms. It primarily causes abdominal pain, diarrhea (which may be bloody if inflammation is at its worst), vomiting (can be continuous), or weight loss, but may also cause complications outside the gastrointestinal tract such as skin rashes, arthritis, inflammation of the eye, tiredness, and lack of concentration.

References

Crohn's disease